Adrian Brolin (6 April 1890 – 15 July 1954) was a Swedish footballer and bandy player who played for IFK Uppsala.

As a footballer, he featured once for the Sweden national football team in 1911, scoring twice against Finland.

As a bandy player, he won nine Swedish championship finals in the 1910s. He made one appearance for Sweden, in 1919.

Career statistics

International

International goals
Scores and results list Sweden's goal tally first.

References

External links
 

Swedish footballers
IFK Uppsala Fotboll players
Sweden international footballers
Association football forwards
Swedish bandy players
IFK Uppsala Bandy players
Sweden international bandy players
1890 births
1954 deaths
People from Hedemora